Events in the year 1866 in Belgium.

Incumbents
Monarch: Leopold II
Head of government: Charles Rogier

Events
January
 7 January – Le Peuple (predecessor organisation of Belgian Labour Party) joins First International.
 28 January – "Manifeste des ouvriers", drafted by Edmond Picard, calls for universal manhood suffrage.

March
 6 March – Belgian-Chinese Treaty of Amity, Commerce and Navigation ratified in Brussels.

May
 28 May – Provincial elections
 31 May – Strikes and lock-outs decriminalised.

June
 Fresh outbreaks in Brussels, Ghent and Antwerp of 1863–75 cholera pandemic.
 12 June – Partial legislative elections of 1866

August
 1 August – Treaty of Amity, Commerce and Navigation between Japan and Belgium, negotiated by Auguste t'Kint, signed in Edo.
 27 August – Antwerp city council makes Dutch the official language of city business.

October
 20 October – State banquet at Brussels for British Volunteers on visit to Belgium.

 21 October – Risk Allah Bey brought to trial in Brussels on charges of murder and forgery.

December
 20 December – Parliamentary enquiry into preparedness of armed forces begins.
 27 December – Belgian-Japanese Treaty of Amity, Commerce and Navigation ratified in Brussels.

Publications
Periodicals
Almanach royal officiel (Brussels, H. Tarlier)
 Collection de précis historiques, vol. 15, edited by Edouard Terwecoren S.J.
 Messager des sciences historiques.

Reference works
 Biographie Nationale de Belgique begins publication.

Books
 Charles Baudelaire, Les Épaves (Brussels)
 Louis Galesloot, Pierre-Albert et Jean de Launay, Hérauts d'Armes du Duché de Brabant, Histoire de leurs procès, 1643-1687 (Brussels)
 Victor Hugo, Travailleurs de la Mer (Brussels)
 Jules de Saint-Genois, Les Flamands d'autrefois

Maps
 Auguste Stessels, Carte générale des bancs de Flandres compris entre Gravelines et l'embouchure de l'Escaut [Map of the sandbanks of the Flemish coast between Gravelines and the mouth of the Scheldt], engraved by J. Nauwens (Antwerp, F. Bizolier)

Art and architecture

Buildings
 St John the Baptist's church, Ghent (Gothic Revival parish church)

Births
 9 January – Albert Baertsoen, painter (died 1922)
 25 January – Emile Vandervelde, politician (died 1938)
 27 April – Émile Royer, politician (died 1916)
 5 July – Maurice Houtart, politician (died 1939)
 14 July – Juliette Wytsman, painter (died 1925)
 2 August – Adrien de Gerlache, Antarctic explorer (died 1934)
 14 August – Charles Jean de la Vallée Poussin, mathematician (died 1962)
 10 December – Louise De Hem, painter (died 1922)

Deaths
Date uncertain
 Joseph Abbeel (born 1786), veteran of Napoleon's Russian campaign

March
 24 March – Jean-Baptist David (born 1801), literary scholar

References

 
Belgium
Years of the 19th century in Belgium
1860s in Belgium
Belgium